Thoracophorus is a genus of unmargined rove beetles in the family Staphylinidae. There are more than 20 described species in Thoracophorus.

Species
These 24 species belong to the genus Thoracophorus:

 Thoracophorus blackburni (Sharp, 1880)
 Thoracophorus brevicristatus (Horn, 1871)
 Thoracophorus brevipenne Sharp, 1880
 Thoracophorus brevipennis (Sharp, 1880)
 Thoracophorus certatus Sharp
 Thoracophorus corticinus Motschulsky, 1837
 Thoracophorus costalis (Erichson, 1840) (furrowed rove beetle)
 Thoracophorus distinguendus
 Thoracophorus elongatus Cameron, 1938
 Thoracophorus exilis (Erichson, 1840)
 Thoracophorus filum Sharp, 1887
 Thoracophorus fletcheri Wendeler, 1927
 Thoracophorus guadalupensis Cameron, 1913
 Thoracophorus hermanii
 Thoracophorus longicollis Motschulsky, 1860
 Thoracophorus palaeobrevicristatus Irmler, 2003
 Thoracophorus perplexus Irmler, 2015
 Thoracophorus proximus Irmler, 1985
 Thoracophorus sculptilis (Erichson, 1840)
 Thoracophorus silvaticus
 Thoracophorus simplex Wendeler, 1930
 Thoracophorus struyvei Irmler, 2015
 Thoracophorus verhaaghi
 Thoracophorus zicsii

References

Further reading

External links

 

Osoriinae
Articles created by Qbugbot